The Isle of Man has many railway lines, both current and historical. This is a list of those lines intended to carry passengers, either for public transport, local convenience, or as a tourist attraction. For many of the lines, locations such as stations, stops and depots are listed.

Isle of Man Railway – South Line

Isle of Man Railway – Peel Line (closed)

Isle of Man Railway – North Line (closed)

Isle of Man Railway – Foxdale Line (closed)

Douglas Bay Horse Tramway

Upper Douglas Cable Tramway (closed)

Snaefell Mountain Railway

Manx Electric Railway

Groudle Glen Railway

Great Laxey Mine Railway

Douglas Southern Electric Tramway (closed)

Cliff railways

Other railways

References 

 
Lists of tourist attractions in the Isle of Man